Si-hyun, also spelled Si-hyeon, or Shi-hyun, Shi-hyeon, Si-hyon, Shi-hyon, is a South Korean unisex given name. The meaning differs based on the hanja used to write each syllable of the name. There are 54 hanja with the reading  "shi" and 42 hanja with the reading "hyun" on the South Korean government's official list of hanja which may be used in given names.

People with this name include:

Son Si-hyun (born 1980), South Korean shortstop for the NC Dinos in the KBO League
Ahn Shi-hyun (born 1984), South Korean professional golfer
Kim Si-hyeon (born 1999), South Korean singer, member of girl group Everglow

See also
List of Korean given names

References

Korean unisex given names